Saleh Al-Yahri (Arabic:صالح اليهري) (born 30 May 1995) is a Qatari footballer. He currently plays for Al-Markhiya as a defender .

Career

Al-Gharafa
Al-Yahri started his career at Al-Gharafa and is a product of the Al-Gharafa's youth system.

Al-Markhiya
On 2016-2017 Season left Al-Gharafa and signed with Al-Markhiya. On 16 September 2017, Al-Yahri made his professional debut for Al-Markhiya against Al-Sadd in the Pro League, and the team won 2-0  However, the Disciplinary Committee of the Football Association decided to adopt the club Al-Sadd victory over Al-Markhiya with three clean goals, after the illegal participation of the arrested player Saleh Al-Yahri against Al-Sadd . On 13 June 2018, renewed his contract with Al-Markhiya.

Al-Shahania (loan)
On 23 July 2019, left Al-Markhiya and signed with Al-Shahania on loan of the season. On 22 August 2018, Al-Yahri made his professional debut for Al-Shahania against Al-Gharafa in the Pro League .

Al-Wakrah (loan)
On 4 November 2020, left Al-Markhiya and signed with Al-Shahania on loan of the season.

External links

References

1995 births
Living people
Qatari footballers
Al-Gharafa SC players
Al-Markhiya SC players
Al-Shahania SC players
Al-Wakrah SC players
Qatar Stars League players
Qatari Second Division players
Association football defenders
Place of birth missing (living people)